Ming Cho Lee (October 3, 1930 – October 23, 2020) was a Chinese-American theatrical set designer and professor at the Yale School of Drama.

Personal life
Lee was born on Oct. 3, 1930, in Shanghai, China to Lee Tsu Fa and Tang Ing. Lee, whose father (Lee Tsu Fa) was a Yale University graduate (1918), moved to the United States in 1949 and attended Occidental College.

Lee married Elizabeth (Rapport) Lee in 1958. They had three sons Richard, Christopher, and David.

Career
Lee first worked on Broadway as a second assistant set designer to Jo Mielziner on The Most Happy Fella in 1956.  His first Broadway play as Scenic Designer was The Moon Besieged in 1962; he went on to design the sets for over 20 Broadway shows, including Mother Courage and Her Children, King Lear, The Glass Menagerie, The Shadow Box, and For Colored Girls Who Have Considered Suicide When the Rainbow Is Enuf. He won the Drama Desk Award for Outstanding Set Design, a Helen Hayes Award, and in 1983 he received a Tony Award for Best Scenic Design for K2. He also designed sets for opera (including eight productions for the Metropolitan Opera and thirteen for the New York City Opera, ballet, and regional theatres such as Arena Stage, the Mark Taper Forum, and the Guthrie Theater.

He designed over 30 productions for Joseph Papp at  The Public Theater, including the original Off-Broadway production of Hair (musical). Starting in 1969, Lee taught at the Yale School of Drama, where he was co-chair of the Design Department. In February 2017, he announced that he would be retiring at the end of the fall semester. He was on the Board of Directors for The Actors Center in Manhattan. Lee is the subject of Ming Cho Lee: A Life in Design by Arnold Aronson, which was published by TCG Books in 2014.

Awards and honors
Lee was inducted into the American Theater Hall of Fame in 1998, and was awarded the National Medal of Arts in 2002. In 1995, he won the  Obie Award for Sustained Excellence for his consistent and valuable contributions to the theatrical community.

He won the Tony Award in 1983 for the play K2 and a lifetime achievement Tony Award in 2013.

See also
 Chinese in New York City

References

Bibliography
Aronson, Arnold. Ming Cho Lee: A Life in Design. New York: Theatre Communications Group, 2014.

External links
 Yale Bulletin biography, March 21, 2003
 AILF Immigrant Achievement Award biography, 1999

 Costume and Scenic Design Collection at the Harry Ransom Center

1930 births
American scenic designers
2020 deaths
Opera designers
Special Tony Award recipients
Tony Award winners
United States National Medal of Arts recipients
Yale School of Drama faculty
Artists from Shanghai
Chinese emigrants to the United States
Occidental College alumni